Patrick Rheaume Joseph Traverse (born March 14, 1974) is a Canadian former professional ice hockey defenceman. He played 279 games in the National Hockey League (NHL) with five teams.

Playing career
As a youth, Traverse played in the 1988 Quebec International Pee-Wee Hockey Tournament with a minor ice hockey team from Hochelaga-Maisonneuve.

Traverse was drafted by the Ottawa Senators in the third round, 50th overall in the 1992 NHL Entry Draft. He was traded to the San Jose Sharks on December 18, 2006, in exchange for Mathieu Biron. He never made an appearance with San Jose, playing for the Sharks' AHL affiliate, the Worcester Sharks for the better part of three seasons. He frequently played in the AHL between NHL stints.

After playing one season for DEG Metro Stars in the Deutsche Eishockey Liga, Traverse signed with rival Hamburg Freezers to a one-year contract on March 19, 2010.

Career statistics

Regular season and playoffs

International

References

External links

1974 births
Boston Bruins players
Canadian ice hockey defencemen
Dallas Stars players
DEG Metro Stars players
Hamburg Freezers players
Hamilton Bulldogs (AHL) players
Hershey Bears players
Ice hockey people from Montreal
Iowa Stars players
Living people
Mighty Ducks of Anaheim players
Montreal Canadiens players
New Haven Senators players
Ottawa Senators draft picks
Ottawa Senators players
Prince Edward Island Senators players
Quebec Citadelles players
Saint-Jean Lynx players
Shawinigan Cataractes players
Worcester IceCats players
Worcester Sharks players
Canadian expatriate ice hockey players in Germany